The Fort Lauderdale Fighting Squids is a United States Australian Football League team, based in Fort Lauderdale, Florida, United States. It was founded in 2005. The Squids played locally until joining the USAFL in 2010. They play in the Eastern Australian Football League.

External links 
USAFL: Fighting Squids website

References

Australian rules football clubs in the United States
Sports in Fort Lauderdale, Florida
Australian rules football clubs established in 2005
2005 establishments in Florida
Sports teams in Florida